The 2022–23 EFL Trophy, known as the Papa Johns Trophy for sponsorship reasons, the 40th season in the history of the competition, is a knock-out tournament for clubs in EFL League One and League Two, the third and fourth tiers of the English football league system, as well as the "Academy teams" of 16 Premier League clubs with Category One status.

The defending champions are Rotherham United but they are unable to defend their trophy due to their promotion to the EFL Championship.

Participating clubs 
48 clubs from League One and League Two.
16 invited Category One Academy teams.

Eligibility criteria for players
For EFL clubs
Minimum of four qualifying outfield players in their starting XI. A qualifying outfield player was one who met any of the following requirements:
Any player who started the previous or following first-team fixture.
Any player who is in the top 10 players at the club who has made the most starting appearances in league and domestic cup competitions this season.
Any player with forty or more first-team starting appearances in their career, including International matches.
Any player on loan from a Premier League club or any EFL Category One Academy club.
A club can play any eligible goalkeeper in the competition.
Any player out on a long loan term at a National League, National League North, or National League South team can play as long as the loaning team agree to allow the player to return for the match.

For invited teams
Minimum of six players in the starting line-up who are aged under 21 on 30 June 2022.
Maximum of two players on the team sheet who are aged over 21 and have also made forty or more senior appearances.

Competition format
Group stage
 Sixteen groups of four teams will be organised on a regionalised basis.
 All groups will include one invited club.
 All clubs will play each other once, either home or away (Academies will as always play all group matches away from home).
 Clubs will be awarded three points for a win and one point for a draw.
 In the event of a drawn game (after 90 minutes), a penalty shoot-out will be held with the winning team earning an additional point.
 Clubs expelled from the EFL will be knocked out of the tournament automatically.
 The top two teams in each group will progress to the knockout stage.

Knockout stage
 Round 2 and 3 of the competition will be drawn on a regionalised basis.
 In Round 2, the group winners will be seeded and the group runners-up will be unseeded in the draw.
 In Round 2, teams who played in the same group as each other in the group stage will be kept apart.

Group stage

Northern Section

Group A

Group B

Group C

Group D

Group E

Group F

Group G

Group H

Southern Section

Group A

Group B

Group C

Group D

Group E

Group F

Group G

Group H

Round of 32
The draw for the Round of 32 was made on Friday 11 November 2022, with ties scheduled to take place on the week commencing 21 November. Despite finishing top of their group, Chelsea U21's match with Peterborough United was moved to London Road Stadium. However, Everton U21 were kept as the home team in their tie against Mansfield Town, which was scheduled to take place at Goodison Park. This round also saw two U21 teams, Manchester United U21 and Wolverhampton Wanderers U21, drawn together. In this case, after a consulation between both clubs and the EFL it was decided that the game would be played at Wolverhampton Wanderers' Molineux Stadium, despite Manchester United U21 finishing first in their group.

Northern Section

Southern Section

Round of 16

The draw for the round of 16 was held on 24 November 2022.  The matches for this round took place on 13 December 2022 except for two ties postponed due to frozen pitches.

Northern Section

Southern Section

Quarter-finals 
The draw for the Quarter-finals was held on 15 December 2022, with the teams no longer being separated geographically in the draw. The matches are scheduled for the week beginning 9 January 2023.

Semi-finals 
The draw for the Semi-finals was held on 14 January 2023.

Final

External links
 EFL Trophy section of official English Football League website

References

EFL Trophy
EFL Trophy
2022–23 English Football League